The Carbonnière tower is a watchtower built at the end of the 13th century to protect the walled city of Aigues-Mortes, in the French department of Gard in the Occitanie region.

Location 
The tower is located on the territory of the municipality of Saint-Laurent-d'Aigouze, in the Gard department in the Occitanie region. It stands in the middle of the marshes, between the Vistre and the Rhône canal in Sète, on the old road linking Saint-Laurent-d'Aigouze to Aigues-Mortes. Its terrace offers a panoramic view of the Petite Camargue.

History 
The Carbonnière tower was mentioned for the first time in a text dated 1346 which gives details on the function of the work: it is said that “this fortress is the key to the kingdom in this region."

Indeed, located in the middle of the marshes, it was the obligatory passage to reach Aigues-Mortes: its crossing was subject to a toll. It was held by a garrison made up of a squire and several guards. The terrace could support up to four pieces of artillery.

It has been classified as a historical monument since 1889.

Architecture 
The tower is built in ashlars to boss (ashlars with protruding central portion and seals accented), just like the Aigues Mortes ramparts. Halfway up, the tower features a row of more regular, darker-colored boss stones. Some ashlars show job marks similar to those found on the ramparts of Aigues-Mortes.

The road once crossed the tower, by a door defended by a portcullis and surmounted by a low arch. The base and the top of the southern and northern facades are pierced with two large loopholes. The parapet of the platform which surmounts the tower has a single niche on each face and a watchtower at each angle.

The site today 
At the end of 2009, the Carbonnière tower was the subject of work aimed at ensuring the safety of the public, in particular on the staircase and the terrace. A discovery trail has also been created in the surrounding marsh. These developments were carried out by the Centre des monuments nationaux, the DRAC of the Languedoc-Roussillon region and the Mixed Syndicate for the protection and management of the Gard Camargue, as part of the Grand site en Petite Camargue.

References 

Buildings and structures in Gard
Monuments historiques of Occitania (administrative region)
13th-century fortifications
Watchtowers